Annette Kar Baxter (November 12, 1926 – September 18, 1983) was an American women's history expert, professor, and author. She spent much of her career at Barnard College, where she taught one of the earliest women's history classes to undergraduate students, in 1966.

Early life and education 
Annette Kar Baxter was born on November 12, 1926, in New York, New York.

She attended New York University for one year before transferring to Barnard College. In 1947 she received an A.B. from Barnard, and began working full-time as an editorial assistant at Random House, a position that she began on a part-time basis her senior year. In the fall she returned to school, earning an A.M. from Smith College in 1948 and another A.M. from Radcliffe College in 1949.

Career 
She then began her life-long career at Barnard, working at first as a lecturer and then as an associate in the history department. She served as the executive secretary for the University Seminar on American Civilization at Columbia from 1953–59, and served as the secretary for the American Studies Bibliography Project of the American Studies Association from 1953–56.

She received her Ph.D. from Brown in 1958 and was promoted to the status of lecturer in the History Department at Barnard. Two years later she became an associate in History. In 1966 she was appointed as an assistant professor of history and was quickly promoted to associate professor status. She reached full professorship in 1971, and in 1975 had the honor of being one of a handful of women to be awarded an endowed chair, named for Adolph and Effie Ochs.

Baxter was a pioneer in the field of women's studies, teaching one of the earliest women's history classes to undergraduates in 1966. Her course served as a model for many future classes at other institutions. She remained involved in a wide variety of activities at Barnard throughout her career, including serving as an advisor to the class of 1962, membership on the Board of Trustees, regularly participating in the Seven College Conference, advising the Thursday Noon Meetings, and playing a vital role in the creation and expansion of the Women's Center at Barnard. She was acting chair of the American Studies Program in 1960-61 and 1963–64, and was made permanent chair of the department in 1967; she also served as chair of the history department from 1974 to 1983. Baxter was also a founding member of the Barnard College Archive.

In addition to her career at Barnard, Baxter involved herself in many other organizations. She served on the Board of Trustees for Conference in Theology for College and University Faculty, Kirkland College (Clinton, New York) and Middlesex School (Concord, Massachusetts). She was a consultant for the National Endowment for the Humanities, the Ford Foundation, National Council of Women, and Mr. Rogers' Neighborhood. She served on committees for the American Association of University Women, American Historical Association, Organization of American Historians, American Studies Association, and many others. She participated in panels and gave speeches on the value of women's history and women's education. She has been called "one of the nation's foremost authorities on the history of women."

Throughout her career, Annette Baxter remained dedicated to the cause of women's education, women's studies, and women's rights. As a member of its Board of Trustees, Baxter fought to keep Barnard independent from Columbia, highlighting what might be lost if the women's college merged with the Ivy league school.

Baxter published numerous book reviews and articles, and edited several series on women's autobiographies and women's studies. She often contributed articles to journals and popular magazines, including Nineteenth-Century Fiction and Harpers, among others. Baxter had four books in progress when she died in 1983.

Personal life 
In 1955, Baxter married psychiatrist James E. Baxter. Their first child, Justin McDonald, was born in 1959, and their daughter, Adrienne Marshall, was born in 1962.

Death 
Annette Baxter died in a fire at her and her husband's summer home on Fire Island on September 18, 1983. She was fifty-six years old. The fire also claimed her husband, James, and a house guest, Oscar Benedetti of Caracas, Venezuela. The couple's son, Justin, who was also at the house at the time, survived.

Legacy 
Barnard established the Annette Kar Baxter Memorial Prize, given to a member of the college's junior class who has distinguished themselves in the study of women's experience.

Works 
 Henry Miller, Expatriate (1961) Pittsburgh: University of Pittsburgh Press
 The Universal Self-Instructor and Manual of General Reference (1970) New York: Winter House [with Albert Ellery Berg]
 To Be a Woman in America: 1850 – 1930 (1978) New York: Times Books [with Constance Jacobs]
 Inwood House: One Hundred and Fifty Years of Service to Women (1980) New York: Inwood House [with Barbara Welter]
 Women's History (1984) New York: Markus Wiener

References

External links 
 Annette Kar Baxter papers at the Sophia Smith Collection, Smith College Special Collections
 Annette K. Baxter artist file at the San Francisco Museum of Modern Art
 "Thoughts on 'Women's Studies' at Barnard, 1971" at Barnard Digital Collections

1926 births
1983 deaths
American feminists
Barnard College alumni
American women writers
African-American women academics
American women academics
African-American academics
People from New York City
20th-century scholars
Academics from New York (state)
Radcliffe College alumni
Smith College alumni
Brown University alumni
New York University alumni
20th-century African-American women
20th-century African-American people
20th-century American women educators
African-American women writers